A call shop is a business providing on-site access to telephones for long-distance calling in countries without widespread home long-distance service. Calls may be prepaid or postpaid.

Payment methods

Prepaid 
A customer visits the call shop, and pays the operator for the call. The operator then activates a phone booth for the customer with billing software. The customer then goes to the phone booth and dials the destination number. The billing software records the call details and corresponding charges for future reference.

Postpaid
Postpaid calling operates in a similar manner, except that when the customer has completed their call(s) the call-shop operator generates an invoice.

Telephony
Public phones